Rino Passigato, GCC, GCSE (born 29 March 1944) is an Italian prelate of the Catholic Church, who was the Apostolic Nuncio to Portugal from 2008 to 2019 and is the current Apostolic Nuncio Emeritus to Portugal.

Biography
Passigato was born on Bovolone, Italy, on 29 March 1944. He was ordained a priest on 29 June 1968 in  Verona, Italy.

Diplomatic career 
In 1991 he was appointed Titular Archbishop of Nova Caesaris and Apostolic Pro-Nuncio to Burundi.

By 1996 he was Apostolic Nuncio to Bolivia and in 1999 he moved on to Peru.

On 8 November 2008, Pope Benedict XVI appointed him Apostolic Nuncio to Portugal.

He also served in the Apostolic Nunciature in Australia in the late 1970s and in the United Kingdom under Apostolic Nuncio Barbaroto.

Portugal

Criticism 
The criticism started shortly after he started his tenure in Portugal and refused to disclose his criteria for the selection of new potential candidates for bishops to the Episcopal Conference of Portugal.

Passagiato was accused by the Portuguese catholic clergy of taking "deplorable" and "inhumane" decisions regarding the affairs of the Holy See in Portugal. Portuguese bishops and clergy accused Passagiato of favouring bishops candidates who are "traditionalists" and "career oriented", and of "not listening to people".

António Francisco dos Santos case 
António Francisco dos Santos was Bishop of Aveiro until 2014. Following the appointment of Manuel Clemente to the Patriarchate of Lisbon, Passigato decided, in a nine-month lengthy process, to relocate Bishop dos Santos to Porto in order to substitute Bishop Clemente.

The suggestion of Bishop dos Santos, made to Pope, was resisted, in the beginning, by the appointee and shortly before his appointment was made official two priests from Aveiro appealed to Passigato's piety due to the poor heart condition of Bishop dos Santos who himself feared not being capable of heading a bigger diocese. Bishop dos Santos would die 3 years after his appointment to Porto due to heart attack.

João Lavrador case 
João Lavrador, current Bishop of Angra, also pleaded Nuncio Passigato for his piety to not be appointed as bishop at the time in order to be able to assist his bedridden parents. Passigato refused such plead and had Lavrador appointed as bishop in 2015; shortly afterward his father died in April 2016 and his mother in January 2017. In this regard Passigato was accused of not taking into consideration Catholic family values.

Honours 
  Grand Cross of the Order of Christ of the Portuguese Republic (11 March 2010).
 Grand Cross of the Order of Saint James of the Sword of the Portuguese Republic (6 June 2009).

See also
 List of heads of the diplomatic missions of the Holy See

References

External links
 Archbishop Rino Passigato at Catholic Hierarchy 

1944 births
Living people
People from Bovolone
20th-century Italian Roman Catholic titular archbishops
Apostolic Nuncios to Portugal
Apostolic Nuncios to Peru
Apostolic Nuncios to Burundi
Apostolic Nuncios to Bolivia
21st-century Italian Roman Catholic titular archbishops